David G. Deininger (born July 9, 1947) is a retired Republican politician and jurist from Wisconsin. He served as a judge on the Wisconsin Court of Appeals for eleven years, from 1996 to 2007, and now serves as a reserve judge.  He was the first chairman of the Wisconsin Government Accountability Board, appointed by Democratic Governor Jim Doyle.  Earlier in his career, he served three and a half terms in the Wisconsin State Assembly, representing parts of Green and Rock counties, and was a Wisconsin Circuit Court Judge in Green County.

Early life and career
Born in Monroe, Wisconsin, Deininger graduated from Monroe High School and went on to the United States Naval Academy.  He graduated in 1969 and served as a nuclear submarine officer in the United States Navy until 1975. He attended the University of Chicago before graduating from the University of Wisconsin Law School in 1978. He began practicing law after graduation.

Public offices
In 1986, Deininger launched a primary challenge against three-term incumbent Republican John T. Manske for his seat in the Wisconsin State Assembly.  The district at the time was composed of parts of Green County, of which Deininger was a resident, and Rock County, where Manske resided.  In the 1984 election, Deininger had worked for Manske's re-election campaign, but declared in 1986 that it was "Green County's turn to be represented in the Assembly."  Deininger won a surprising upset in the September primary and was then unopposed in the general election.  He was subsequently re-elected in 1988 and 1990, and, after redistricting in 1991, was elected to another term in 1992.

In 1994, he ran unopposed for election to the Wisconsin Circuit Court in Green County, and subsequently resigned from the Wisconsin Assembly. Only two years later, in 1996, he was appointed to the Wisconsin Court of Appeals by Governor Tommy Thompson to fill the vacancy created by the retirement of Judge Robert D. Sundby. He was elected to two six-year terms on the Court of Appeals, in 1997 and 2003, but retired in 2007.

Government Accountability Board
In 2008 Deininger was appointed to the Wisconsin Government Accountability Board (GAB), by Governor Jim Doyle, and served as the GAB's first chairman. The Attorney General found that even though Deininger had retired from the Court of Appeals, he was ineligible to serve on the GAB because the term he was elected to had not expired. Following the Attorney General's finding, Deininer resigned from the Board.

Governor Doyle reappointed Deininger to the GAB in 2010. Governor Scott Walker reappointed him to the GAB to serve until 2016, but  withdrew his appointment in November 2013 citing concerns that the Wisconsin Senate would not approve the appointment.

After retirement
Deininger now serves as a reserve judge. He and his wife Mary reside in Monroe, and are raising their grandson Emerson following the death of their daughter.

Electoral history

Wisconsin Assembly (1986, 1988, 1990, 1992)

| colspan="6" style="text-align:center;background-color: #e9e9e9;"| Republican Primary, September 9, 1986

| colspan="6" style="text-align:center;background-color: #e9e9e9;"| General Election, November 4, 1986

References

External links
 
 Deininger, David G. 1947 at Wisconsin Historical Society
 Judge David G. Deininger at Wisconsin Government Accountability Board (Archived)

|-

People from Monroe, Wisconsin
United States Naval Academy alumni
Military personnel from Wisconsin
University of Wisconsin Law School alumni
Wisconsin state court judges
Wisconsin Court of Appeals judges
Republican Party members of the Wisconsin State Assembly
1947 births
Living people